The Pacific Gateway is a strategy of the Government of British Columbia to build new and upgraded road, rail, port and airport infrastructure which will provide importers with a reliable link in the North American supply chain and exporters with greater access to foreign markets. It is similar to the federal government's Asia–Pacific Gateway and Corridor Initiative.

External links
 Official website

Transport in British Columbia